Astutillo Malgioglio (born 3 May 1958) is an Italian former professional footballer who played as a goalkeeper. He made 224 appearances in the top two divisions of Italian football, 44 of which were in Serie A.

Honours

Club
Roma
 Coppa Italia: 1983–84

Inter
 Serie A: 1988–89
 Supercoppa Italiana: 1989
 UEFA Cup: 1990–91

Individual
Inter Milan Hall of Fame: 2019

References

External links
 

1958 births
Living people
Italian footballers
Association football goalkeepers
U.S. Cremonese players
Bologna F.C. 1909 players
Brescia Calcio players
U.S. Pistoiese 1921 players
A.S. Roma players
S.S. Lazio players
Inter Milan players
Atalanta B.C. players
UEFA Cup winning players
Serie A players
Serie B players